The Wideboys are a British record production and remixing duo, active since 1996. The duo have remixed many songs by a wide range of artists. The following is a list of notable songs which they have officially remixed. See the track listing section of the song articles for reference; citations are otherwise included if there is no track listing section in a song article or if a Wideboys remix listing does not appear on the track listing section of a song article.

A
Alexandra Burke - "Elephant"
Alex Gaudino - "I'm in Love (I Wanna Do It)"
Alexis Jordan - "Happiness"
Alicia Keys - "Teenage Love Affair"
All Saints - "Black Coffee"
Alphabeat - "Hole in My Heart"
Amelia Lily - "Shut Up (And Give Me Whatever You Got)"
Anne-Marie and James Arthur - "Rewrite the Stars"
Aretha Franklin - "Rolling in the Deep (The Aretha Version)"
Artful Dodger - "Re-Rewind (The Crowd Say Bo Selecta)"
Artful Dodger - "Woman Trouble"

B
Bananarama - "Love Comes"
Basshunter - "Please Don't Go"
Basshunter - "All I Ever Wanted"
Ben Haenow - "Second Hand Heart"
Black Eyed Peas - "The Time (Dirty Bit)"
Breathe Carolina - "Blackout"
Breathe Carolina - "Hit and Run"

C
Cahill - "Trippin' on You"
Cascada - "Fever"
Cascada - "Pyromania"
Cascada - "San Francisco"
Cher Lloyd - "Swagger Jagger"
Cheryl Cole - "Call My Name"
Cheryl Cole - "The Flood"
Clean Bandit - "Solo"
Clean Bandit - "Tears"
Conor Maynard - "Animal"
Conor Maynard - "Vegas Girl"

D
Demi Lovato - "La La Land"
Drumsound & Bassline Smith -

E
Ella Henderson - "Yours"
Emeli Sandé - "My Kind of Love"
Estelle - "No Substitute Love"
Example - "Kickstarts"
Example - "Midnight Run"
Example - "Won't Go Quietly"

F
Far East Movement - "Live My Life"
Fleur East - "Sax"
Florrie - "Little White Lies"
Foxes - "Holding onto Heaven"

G
Gabriella Cilmi - "On a Mission"
Girls Aloud - "The Loving Kind"
G.R.L. - "Ugly Heart"

H
Hollywood Undead - "Comin' In Hot"

I
Ida Corr - "Ride My Tempo"
Iggy Azalea - "Change Your Life"

J
James Blunt - "Stay the Night"
Janet Jackson - "Feedback"
Jason Derulo - "In My Head"
Jason Derulo - "The Sky's the Limit"
Jason Derulo - "Swalla"
Jason Derulo - "What If"
Jennifer Lopez - "Brave"
JLS - "Hottest Girl in the World"
JLS - "Take a Chance on Me"
Jody Watley - "I Want Your Love"

K
Kesha - "C'Mon"
Kristine W - "The Power of Music"

L
Labrinth - "Express Yourself"
Labrinth - "Let the Sun Shine"
Lawson - "Taking Over Me"
Leona Lewis - "Trouble"
Liberty - "Thinking It Over"
Lily Allen - "The Fear"
Little Boots - "Remedy"
Little Mix - "Hair"
Liza Fox - "I Am Not I"
Lloyd - "How We Do It (Around My Way)"
LMFAO - "Party Rock Anthem"
Luke Friend - "Hole in My Heart"

M
Madison Beer - "Say It to My Face"
Mark Ronson - "Uptown Funk"
Maverick Sabre - "No One"
Meridian Dan - "German Whip"
Michelle Williams - "We Break the Dawn"
Mini Viva - "One Touch"

N
N-Dubz - "Ouch"
N.E.R.D. - "Hot-n-Fun"
Nico & Vinz - "That's How You Know"
Nicole Scherzinger - "On the Rocks"
Nicole Scherzinger - "Right There"

O
Olly Murs - "Troublemaker"
Olly Murs - "Up"
Owl City and Carly Rae Jepsen - "Good Time"

P
Parade - "Louder"
Pink - "Just Like Fire"
Priyanka Chopra - "In My City"
Professor Green - "Little Secrets"
The Pussycat Dolls - "Whatcha Think About That"
The Pussycat Dolls - "When I Grow Up"

Q
Qwote - "Throw Your Hands Up (Dançar Kuduro)"

R
Rihanna - "Don't Stop the Music"
Rihanna - "Question Existing"
Rihanna - "Shut Up and Drive"
Rihanna - "Te Amo"

S
The Saturdays - "Disco Love"
The Saturdays - "Just Can't Get Enough"
The Saturdays - "Up"
Selena Gomez & the Scene - "Round & Round"
September - "Can't Get Over"
Shanks & Bigfoot - "Sing-A-Long"
Snoop Dogg - "Sensual Seduction"
Starboy Nathan - "Diamonds"
Steps - "Scared of the Dark"

T
Taio Cruz - "Higher"
The Ting Tings - "Hands"
Tru Faith & Dub Conspiracy - "Freak like Me"

U
Usher - "Numb"

V
Vanessa Amorosi - "This Is Who I Am"

W
Wideboys - "Sambuca"
Wretch 32 - "Hush Little Baby"

Notes
Please refer to the Track listing sections of the above song articles.

References

Wideboys